Czarnowiec  is a village in the administrative district of Gmina Reszel, within Kętrzyn County, Warmian-Masurian Voivodeship, in northern Poland.

The village has a population of 107.

References

Czarnowiec